is a fictional superhero from the 2006 Ultra Series entry, Ultraman Mebius. In the series, Mebius was introduced as a rookie member of the Land of Light's , who was sent to Earth for the first time after the previous Ultra, Ultraman 80, left Earth. Upon his arrival, Mebius fought against a series of monster attacks on Earth while at the same time joining the ranks of Crew GUYS as Mirai Hibino.

During the series' run, Ultraman Mebius celebrated the 40th anniversary of Ultra Series, with the setting going back to the Showa Era universe and the titular character meeting with the Ultra Brothers. Aside from that, some of the threats that Mebius/GUYS faced in the series proper were related to the past Ultra Brothers' battles with their adversaries. Despite the declining viewer rate, his series continued to grow popular after the release of Ultraman Mebius & Ultraman Brothers, so much so that the selling rate of toys had achieve a good rate. The guest appearances of the Ultra Brothers in his series proper further boosted the viewer rating, becoming a series that is enjoyable for both children and adults.

In the series, Mebius is voiced by Shunji Igarashi, who was also Mirai Hibino's actor. His grunts for Mebius were archived afterwards for future appearances.

Character conception

Setting
As a series that celebrated the 40th anniversary of Ultra Series, Ultraman Mebius was set in a world where the Earth has been in a period of peace for about 25 years since the departure of Ultraman 80. The series not only reintroduced characters and Ultra Kaiju from the past (mainly from the phase 2 of the Showa series), but also paid tribute to past incidents that are related to the Showa Era series. Mirai Hibino revealing his alter ego as Ultraman Mebius in the middle of the series was a break from the original tradition of the Ultra Series, where the Ultra/human relation is exposed only in the final arc of the series.

Because Ultraman Mebius is depicted as a rookie Ultraman who cooperates with a rookie Earth Defense Team members, the series adopts the element of a developing rookie, with key elements from Ultraman Nexus, such as "friendship" and "bonds" in a more universal manner. It is also a coincidence that many of the filming crew members for Nexus, such as Hiroyasu Shibuya participated in the production.

Mebius' grunts were originally high pitched in the early series, but starting from episode 23 and onward, they were deepened under the request of supervisor Yuichi Abe in hopes of emphasizing Mebius' growth of character.

Design

Ultraman Mebius was designed by Hiroshi Maruyama, who based it on the original unused design of Ultraman Nexus, called . His face is designed in a resemblance to Tsushima leopard cat. In contrast to more recent Ultra Warriors, Mebius lacked any decorations on his forehead (e.g. Beam Lamp). His Protector chest features the combined use of materials such as FRP and Polyurethane, thus becoming the foundation for his Color Timer to be covered by said organ. His Mebius Brace had its design motif revolve around fire and was proposed to be the original location of said Mebius's Color Timer, as original sketching featured him with the lack of aforementioned device on his chest.

Other forms of Mebius also include:
Mebius Burning Brave: This form is designed after the original Ultraman himself.
Mebius Infinity: This form design was made simultaneously with the original Mebius (which was completed sooner) and incorporated many of the rejected designs from Ultraman Nexus.
Mebius Phoenix Brave: The idea of having Mebius combine with Ultraman Hikari and Crew GUYS was already in conception since the beginning of the series, although the initial plan was for them to merge with members of the Ultra Brothers, which was only demonstrated with Sakomizu bonding with Zoffy.

Naming
His name "Mebius" is related to the Möbius strip, further associating the Ultraman to his main design motif, the infinity symbol (∞).

History

Ultraman Mebius
Mebius was a rookie member of the Inter-Galactic Defense Force, who was bestowed the Mebius Brace and sent to Earth by the Father of Ultra as the next Ultraman to guard it. Sometime before his arrival, he encountered an astronaut named Hiroto Ban, who sacrificed himself to save his father and the entire ship's crew from being sucked into a wormhole that entered the Ultra Zone. Mebius tried to reach the man in the last minute but failed and decided to use his image in hopes of honoring his sacrifice, while the naming his human form Mirai came from Hiroto's father, Tetsuro.

In the beginning of the series, Mebius encountered Bogar, who orchestrated several of the monster attacks in the early arc of the series. Mebius/Mirai cooperated with the reformed Crew GUYS in saving the Earth from monsters and alien threats while both Ultra and attack team begin to experience character development, from newcomers of their respective fields to experts. Mebius also clashes with Hunter Knight Tsurugi, a scientist from his own kind who bonded with former GUYS captain Serizawa and hunts Bogar to avenge the destruction of Planet Aarb. After putting aside their differences, the two managed to defeat Bogar and for Tsurugi to free himself from his armor while renaming himself as Hikari by Ryu. Before leaving Earth, Hikari entrusted Mebius with the Knight Brace, allowing the young warrior to assume Mebius Brave.

In the middle of the series, a mysterious invasion group made their move on Earth by sending their scout, Inpelaizer. This was after his battle with Nova, when Mebius was called back by the Inter-Galactic Defense Force, due to the threat being too strong for him. Unable to defy the Father of Ultra's orders, Mirai spent his last day on the Earth with the Crew GUYS members. While visiting Ryu on his day off, Mirai revealed his true identity to him before fighting the Inpelaizer. His instructor, Taro, was sent to continue the fight before Mebius fell due to exhaustion. After being treated at the Phoenix Nest, Mirai told Ryu of his people's background before disappearing. He watched GUYS and Taro's efforts to hold off the Inpelaizer, from the sidelines. Despite being ordered not to fight, Mirai transformed in front of his teammates and fought alongside his instructor. Despite, collapsing from his injury, his bond with Crew GUYS brought forth Mebius Burning Brave, successfully destroying the robot for the final time. Taro decided to approve Mebius' request to stay, seeing how his bonds with the earthlings helped him counter the threat. During Hikari's reappearance, Mebius returned the Knight Brace and witnessed his battle against Alien Babarue, while unmasking the impostor to restore his reputation.

Soon he faced many threats that were related to the same invader that sent Inpelaizer, including the group dubbed the "Dark Four Heavenly Kings", serving the dark lord known as "the Emperor". With his battles nearing to a close, the support he gained from GUYS and members of the Ultra Brothers helped him to move forward. In the finale, Mebius' identity was exposed to the public and "the emperor" demanded Earth to surrender Mebius in exchange for their safety. While the civilians turn their backs on the Ultra, Sakomizu's words caused them to change their mind. Seeing this, the Inpelaizer troops was sent to attack Mebius and the Crew GUYS before they were supported by Hikari and their alien allies. The true mastermind revealed himself as Alien Empera, the infamous villain who once instigated the Ultimate Wars and fought in a deathmatch against the Father of Ultra. He easily thwarted all resistance and covered the Earth in darkness by covering the entire sun. With Crew GUYS not giving up, Ryu (bonded with Ultraman Hikari) and the entire Crew GUYS resonated with Mirai into Mebius Phoenix Brave, while Sakomizu sent down the Spacium Redoublizer to boost the combined Ultra's attack before bonding with Zoffy and joining the fray. Following Empera's destruction, Mirai bid farewell to his teammates and returned to the Land of Light.

Ultraman Mebius & Ultraman Brothers
Sometime before episode 23, Mirai was sent on a mission in Kobe, meeting Aya and Takato, a boy who lost his faith in Ultra Warriors due to an incident involving Cherubim. After fighting Alien Temperor as Mebius, Mirai met the original Ultra Brothers in their human forms, who then told him of humanity's nature. Later Mirai was poisoned by Zarab in order for the latter to impersonate Mebius and wreck havoc in Kobe until Mebius reappear and destroyed his impostor. But with his energy running out, Alien Guts crucified him in mid-air and quarantined the whole city to bring out the Ultra Brothers. Despite them showing up and defeated Guts and Nackle to free Mebius, the victory was short lived when the two aliens imprisoned them instead, leaving Mebius to revert to his human form out of exhaustion.

Regaining his strength, Mirai transformed and challenged the aliens before freeing the Ultra Brothers. As it turned out, their usurped energies were used to lift the seal that had imprisoned Yapool and U-Killersaurus a long time ago with Nackle, the last alien left, being eliminated after his service has no longer needed. The Ultra Brothers were joined and replenished by Zoffy and Taro in the battle. Seeing the monster holding Aya as a hostage, the Ultra Brothers fused with Mebius into Mebius Infinity, successfully destroying U-Killersaururs Neo and freeing its captive. In the aftermath, Mirai returned to the Phoenix Nest with Zoffy and Taro flying pass.

Ultraman Mebius Side Story: Hikari Saga
A side story that focused on Ultraman Hikari, Mebius was mentioned several times by said Ultra Warrior. In SAGA 3, Alien Babarue briefly impersonated Mebius to lure Hikari to Planet Aarb.

Superior Ultraman 8 Brothers
Taking place around episode 32 of the series, Mirai/Mebius was sent to an alternate universe by a girl in red shoes, who sought his help. Mebius first appeared in Daigo's dream where he battled against King Guesra and succeeded with Daigo's help. Meeting the civilian in his human form, Mirai was brought to the alternate counterparts of Showa Ultras human form but realized they were normal humans. After fighting against King Pandon, Mebius was then imprisoned and petrified by Super Alien Hipporit, leaving the Earth with little to no resistance. It wasn't until Daigo, Asuka and Gamu transformed into Ultra Warriors, followed by the alternate Showa Ultras who would later free Mebius, that he rejoined the battle. After destroying the dark mastermind, Mirai returned to his original universe while saluting Daigo and the alternate Ultra Warriors.

In this movie, a new suit for Ultraman Mebius was specifically made instead of reusing the original one from TV series.

Ultraman Mebius Side Story: Armored Darkness
After Hikari failed to exterminate Armored Darkness, Mebius was sent to fight against the giant armor but due to fighting in the Darkness Fear, his energy slowly weakened. When Hikari regained consciousness, he briefly paralyzed the armor in place for Mebius to steal the Darkness Broad (a sword) and slash its helmet, causing the armor to deactivate. When comforting a remorse Haruzaki, Mebius/Mirai revealed that Ryu had been saved by Ultraman King and with the Crew GUYS arriving, they hatched a plan to save Hikari, which was not only successful but also destroyed the armor. But as it reformed again, both Ultra Warriors fought him to a standstill before combining into Mebius Phoenix Brave, using the taken Darkness Broad to leave a huge gap and fire Mebium Knight Shoot. Mebius the teleported Crew GUYS away from Darkness Fear while Hikari took it to the Land of Light to be destroyed. Mirai was given the permission to stay on Earth for a while longer, allowing him to have a proper reunion with his friends.

Ultraman Mebius Side Story: Ghost Reverse
Prior to the events of Mega Monster Battle: Ultra Galaxy, Mebius joined Taro and Ace in a fight against the revived Heavenly Kings until they were captured, with Hikari defecting to their side. In order to save his brothers in arms, Mebius was sent to the Valley of the Flames to retrieve the Giga Battle Nizer. He was joined by Mechazam, a robot that he met before who wanted to follow Mebius' path of being stronger. The two soon fought against EX Zetton and managed to both get the Battle Nizer and defeat the monster but Mechazam sacrificed himself to save Mebius from falling lava. Returning to surface, Hikari exposes his cover and saved Taro and Ace allowing the Ultra Warriors to fight back. When Alien Mefilas revived Mechazam as Ghost Reverse and docked the Battle Nizer to revive Alien Empera, Mebius faced the dilemma of destroying his newfound friend until Mechazam reassured him, allowing Mebius to carry out his duty.

Subsequent history
Mega Monster Battle: Ultra Galaxy (2009): Following Belial's escape, Ultraman Mebius was among a number of Ultra Warriors that tried to stop Belial from advancing to the Plasma Spark. Alongside Ultraman and Ultraseven, he survived Belial's assault on Land of Light and recruited Rei to assist them in their battle, later being joined by, Ultraman Dyna and later the Leo Brothers and Seven's son, Ultraman Zero. In English dub, he is voiced by John Katona.
Ultraman Zero: The Revenge of Belial (2010): Ultraman Mebius was among the Space Garrison members that studied the Darklop's remains and donated his light to Zero's travel sphere so that the youth could travel to an alternate universe. He was also among the Ultras that fought against Kasier Belial's army during his invasion on the Land of Light.
Ultraman Saga (2012): Although he never appeared, Mebius Infinity was planned to appear in the early draft of the movie.
Shin Ultraman Retsuden (2013-2016): Narrated by Ultraman Ginga, episode 152 of the biography series has him showing the viewers of a sparring match held between Mebius and his teacher, Taro.
Ultraman Ginga S The Movie (2015): Mebius was among the Heisei Ultras that were held captive by Etelgar until the UPG members freed them. While the other Heisei Ultras made their way to the top of Etelgar's tower, Mebius was left behind to fight against a fake Alien Empera before joining other Heisei Ultras to destroy Etelgar's castle. Alongside other preceding Heisei Ultras, Mebius contributed his signature finisher, Mebium Shoot to Hikaru's Ultra Fusion Brace for the completion of Ultraman Ginga Victory. In the Ginga S Movie, he was voiced by Jun Fukuyama in his first voice acting role in Mebius' live portrayal and by Nicholas Manelick in the English Dub. As with all Heisei Ultraman, Mebius's dialogue is accompanied with him shouting the name of his attacks. This part was made intentional by movie director Koichi Sakamoto, who wants the young audiences (children) to remember their attacks.
Ultra Fight Victory (2015): Though not appeared, Mebius' silhouette was present when Ultraman Ginga Victory utilized his Mebium Shoot to attack Super Grand King Spectre, only for the monster to shrug it off easily.
Ultraman Orb (2016): Ultraman Mebius was mentioned to be the sealer of Maga-Basser before Jugglus released the King Demon Beast. Upon its defeat, Mebius' Ultra Fusion Card was acquired by Gai, who used it alongside Ultraman Taro's card to transform into Ultraman Orb Burnmite. During the final episode of the series, Mebius' and the other Ultra Fusion Cards in Gai's possession transformed into physical projections of their owner to assist Ultraman Orb in delivering the finishing blow to Magata no Orochi while Juggler held off the monster long enough to expose its weak spot.
Ultraman Geed (2017): Mebius joined the Ultra Brothers in a battle against Ultraman Belial before he initiated Crisis Impact. What happened to him and the rest of the Ultra Warriors is unknown.

Reiwa Era
Ultraman Taiga (2019): Ultraman Mebius was mentioned in the first and second episodes of Tri-Squad Voice Drama, as the Triger Shot, a weapon which belonged to Crew GUYS were among those archived by Firis. The weapon itself also contained distorted voice recordings of Mebius' time with Crew GUYS and this inspire Taiga to train himself again.
Ultra Galaxy Fight: In the miniseries' English dub, Mebius' voice is provided by Maxwell Powers.
The Absolute Conspiracy (2021): Following Ultraman Z's recruitment into the Inter-Galactic Defense Force, Mebius trained Z in Zero's place before the two volunteered to assist the Ultra League in their failed attempt to prevent Yullian's kidnapping by The Kingdom.
The Destined Crossroad (2022): Mebius later trains Ultrawoman Grigio, pointing out the necessity for her to develop her own fighting style but compliments her role as a healer. When The Kingdom try to stop Yullian's rescue in Planet Blizzard, Mebius joins the Ultra Brothers and reformed Mebius Infinity to stop the incoming Absolutian troops from outnumbering the Inter-Galactic Defense Force.
After its theft and destruction of Genegarg on Earth, Mebius was among those salvaged by GAFJ and retrieved by Ultraman Z, using it alongside Cosmos and Nexus to execute . In the twenty-first episode of Ultraman Z & Ultraman Zero Voice Drama (taking place before the series), Mebius set his sight to become an instructor like Taro and volunteered to be Z's companion in mission.

Profile
Ultraman Mebius's statistics below were mentioned in the original series, while additional info were brought up in magazines and official websites.

Height: micro ~ 49 m (51 m for Mebius Infinity)
Weight: 35,000 t (36,000 t for Mebius burning Brave, Phoenix Brave and Mebius Infinity)
Time Limit: 3 minutes
Flight Speed: Mach 10 (Unidentified for Mebius Infinity)
Birthplace: Nebula M78, Land of Light
Year Debut: 2006
First Appearance: Ultraman Mebius (2006)

Description
As the official website of Tsuburaya Productions stated: "Ultraman Mebius is a young warrior of the Space Garrison who fights through the use of Mebium Blade and Mebium Shoot via the Mebius Brace given by the Father of Ultra. While on Earth, he assumed the form Mirai Hibino of Crew GUYS. Having recognized Mebius' success on Earth, the Ultra Brothers also fights alongside him."

Transformation
Mirai Hibino transforms into Ultraman Mebius through the use of the Mebius Brace. First he summons the Mebius Brace on his left arm and slides the Crystal Circle with his right hand, raising the device in mid-air and shouts "Mebius!". The background soon changes where an infinity symbol appears and Mebius then appears from an energy burst. As he approaches closer to the screen his left hand outstretched before switching to his right hand. In the final episode, Mirai was able to transform into Mebius by his own will, moments before he left Earth for his home world Nebula M78.

Features and weapons
: A breastplate which serves as the sturdiest part of his anatomy. Unlike other Ultra Warriors, the Protector keeps his  from emerging outside his skin and is shaped like a diamond.
: A device which was bestowed by the Father of Ultra. Other variations also existed in the series progress, such as:
: A combination of Mebius Brace and Knight Brace. The Knight Brace is connected to the tip of Mebius Brace and doing so would transform Mebius into Mebius Brave. Most of Mebius' attacks were solely through the use of Mebium Knight Blade energy sword which was generated from said weapon.
: A black variation of the original Mebius Brace, wielded by Mebius Infinity after his fusion with first six Ultra Brothers.
A golden copy of the Mebius Brace is wielded by Mebius Killer in episode 43 of the series, who used it to channel copies of Mebius' original attacks.
: Ultraman Hikari's weapon and transformation device, which was bestowed by Ultraman King. During Hikari's departure from Earth, he entrusted Mebius with said device, allowing him to create Knight Mebius Brace and gaining access to the Mebius Brave form. It was returned to Hikari in episode 35 but in spite of that, Mebius is able to wield the device once more should he combine with Hikari into Mebius Phoenix Brave. As with Ultraman Hikari, the Knight Brace is also designed by Hiroshi Maruyama under the sword motif.
: The original sword of Armored Darkness, who used it as his spare weapon aside from his Darkness Trident. After the captured Hikari managed to immobilize Armored Darkness, Mebius took this opportunity to swipe his blade and deliver a small cut on his helmet. As Phoenix Brave, Mebius stole the weapon from said armor and delivered a slash that made a large gap from head to pelvis before to firing the Mebium Knight Shoot, and successfully destroying it.

Forms, powers and abilities
Having been trained by Ultraman Taro in his youth, Mebius fights with balanced fighting skills, using both melee and ranged attacks. The , a burst of energy in the shape of an arrow head, can be carried out by Mirai, when fighting against human sized opponents while maintaining his human disguise. In episode 26, he demonstrated the ability to digitize into the cyberspace, which pays tribute to the title character of Gridman the Hyper Agent. The techniques he learned or shared with past Ultra Warriors are
Ultraman's teleportation.
Jack's .
: Based on Taro's Ultra Dynamite. To compensate for Taro's , the Mebius Brace act as its replacement. The differences between both techniques are their explosion time.
: Based on Leo's Leo Kick but as Mebius lacked the necessity to produce his own heat, he is required to spin at a high speed after performing at a high jump, allowing him to produce his own flame through friction. In the middle of using this attack, Mebius is also able to instantly assume Mebius Burning Brave through his own flame.
: An ability used by Ultra Warriors to create wormholes that moves them tens of thousands light years apart.

Apart from that, he can also gain access to these forms:
: First appeared in episode 18. By using the Knight Brace left by Hikari, Mebius would combine it with the Mebius Brace into Knight Mebius Brace and assumed Mebius Brave. This form looks the same as his basic form save for the fact that it has a gold "V" line running along the chest and arms. In episode 35, since the Knight Brace was returned to Hikari, Mebius lost the ability to use this form.
: First appeared in episode 30. Through his bond with Crew GUYS, he was granted a new form. It has a gold fire symbol line running along the chest, abdomen and upper arms. Aside from being stronger, he is able to summon pyrokinetic attacks and is strong enough to withstand the intense heat in the Valley of the Flames.
: First appeared in the final episode. Together with the other members of GUYS, Mirai/Mebius and Hikari combine their souls and are able to take on this form.
: Only appeared in Ultraman Mebius & Ultra Brothers. By combining the powers of all the first six Ultra Brothers, Mebius was able to reach this form to defeat U-Killersaurus Neo. The silver lines running along his body become dark in color, and is somewhat rougher. When saving Aya Jinguji, who was held captive in said monster, Mebius used  to shield her from the impact. He was also planned to appear in Ultraman Saga aside from his feature film.
: Featured in Superior 8 Ultraman Brothers. Mebius and the alternate Ultra Warriors received strength from the citizen's hopes and gained a power boost that was identical to Tiga's Glitter Tiga. His attack combined with the alternate Ultras, was called , made by combining their original finisher attacks.
: A momentary power boost that is nigh-identical to Ultraman Tiga's Glitter Tiga. Appeared in Ginga S The Movie, this form is used by all Heisei Ultras to empower their finishers and destroy Etelgar's castle.

Human Host

Mirai Hibino

 is the human form of Ultraman Mebius, with the appearance of an 18 years old.

Mebius created his Mirai form after being inspired by the heroics of a young astronaut named , who rescued his father and the rest of his ship's crew from being sucked into Ultra Zone at the cost of his life and dream to go to Earth. Mebius noticed had tried to save the young man but failed, causing him to adapt Hiroto's appearance on Earth. After visiting Hiroto's father Tetsuro, who at first disapproved of Mebius' decision but changed his mind, wanting the young warrior to honor his son's wish to step on Earth. It was also during that time where Mebius get his human name Mirai, from Tetsuro's own words . During that time, only Tetsuro, Sakomizu and Misaki were among the few to know his true identity. As no photo of Hiroto existed on Earth, this allowed Mirai to strengthen the validity of his disguise.

His membership into GUYS began after his first battle as Mebius against Dinozaur. At that time, he joined the team to support Ryu Aihara, the sole surviving member of original GUYS after the entire team eliminated by said monster. Mirai convinces four other civilians he came across to join the team after seeing their bravery in saving kindergarten rabbits and succeeded. His favorite food is curry rice, being the first thing he ate on Earth, and he later learns how to cook from Teppei's mother. He is also a skillful pilot in the field, thus being the only member whose crash-landing record is zero.

Despite his fascination for Earth and humanity, Mirai shows little to no common senses due to still being a newcomer on the planet. His admiration for humanity were questioned several times after being exposed with their darker sides, such as the magazine reporter Hirukawa, and those who wished him to be turned over the Emperor in the finale. During that point, he learns the good and bad points of humanity and the reason why the Ultra Brothers called Earth as an irreplaceable planet. After his final battle against Empera, Mirai has one final conversation with his team members and promised to tell the junior Ultras in his planet of the experiences he had on Earth before leaving for good.

Other hosts
In episode 50 of Ultraman Mebius, Mebius and Hikari's fusion into Mebius Phoenix Brave not only housing Mirai and Ryu, but also the rest of the Crew GUYS, due to their sheer bonds making up this formation.

In other media

Novel
Prior to the series, Mebius' past before his arrival was told in the Ultraman Mebius DVD cover's liner notes (except volume 1). Back in the Land of Light, Mebius was shown to have participated in a battle when Alien Bat's army of Zettons invaded the Land of Light and Alien Katan leading a troop of Saucer Creatures.
Ultraman Mebius: Anderes Horizont (2007-2009): The novel adaptation of the series, taking place in an alternate timeline that is nigh identical to the series. It introduced GUYS rookie member Kanata Haruzaki as the protagonist while Mirai/Mebius being a supporting character.

Video games
Compati Hero Series
Ultraman Mebius is one of the playable characters in the crossover game HEROES' VS. The game itself is Shunji Igarashi's final voice role as Mebius before his retirement.
Lost Heroes (2013)/Lost Heroes 2 (2015): Mebius is one of the playable characters in this game. Lost Heroes features Jun Fukuyama's debut in voicing Ultraman Mebius.
Super Hero Generation (2014): Mebius is revealed as one of the playable characters in the game, featuring his forms and abilities in the series proper.
His main weapon is a katana.
The 2020 mobile game adaption for the 2011 Ultraman manga, Ultraman Be Ultra has an Ultraman Suit designed after Mebius. His weapon is a  wing unit named after one of the Crew GUYS' mechas.

Reception

Critical commentary

Following his success in the audition, Shunji's first role as Mirai Hibino began when recording for the premier movie Ultraman Mebius & Ultra Brothers. The other GUYS members followed in suit after recordings in episodes 1 and 2 of the original series respectively. A fan of the Ultra Series, he has declared that the desire to play the role of Ultraman was one of the reasons he entered the entertainment world, and that being able to work with the same actors who had played his childhood heroes was one of his highest personal accomplishments. His favorite Ultra Warrior is the title character of Ultraman Tiga, having watched the series at the age of 10 years old and was excited to portray alongside Hiroshi Nagano, Daigo Madoka's actor in Superior Ultraman 8 Brothers. Shunji initially had no knowledge of swimming until the recording of episode 4, which involves a scene Mirai diving into the pool to retrieve Konomi's glasses. When being asked on his opinion regarding the Crew GUYS, Shunji answered "The command room is like a house. It's warm, gentle and like a family."

Popularity

In the Ultra Series' 45th anniversary, Ultraman Mebius scored the third place in an Ultra Hero popularity ranking and maintains the same rank in another ranking poll that was launched in 2013.

In commemoration to Ultraman Mebius & Ultraman Brothers, his image was used as the front cover of a Tokyu 9000 series commuter train as part of the project .

Notes

References
Citations

Bibliography

External links
Ultraman Mebius in Ultraman Mebius official site 
Ultraman Mebius in Tsuburaya Productions

Japanese superheroes
Fictional characters with superhuman strength
Fictional giants
Mebius
Television characters introduced in 2006